Chandraprabha is a given name. Notable people with the name include:

Chandraprabha Aitwal (born 1941), Indian mountain climber 
Chandraprabha Urs (1946–2016), Indian National Congress politician

See also
 Chandraprabha, the eighth Tirthankara of Avasarpini